The women's halfpipe competition of the FIS Freestyle World Ski Championships 2013 was held at Tryvann Ski Resort, Oslo, Norway on March 4 (qualifying)  and March 5 (finals). 
22 athletes from 11 countries competed.

Qualification 

The following are the results of the qualification.

Final 
The following are the results of the final.

References 

Halfpipe, women's